Barbro Holmberg (born 7 April 1952) is a Swedish Social Democratic politician. On 10 October 2003 she was appointed Minister for Migration and Asylum Policy in the Swedish Government. As a consequence of the change of government following the 2006 government election, she left office on 6 October 2006, and in 2008 she was appointed the governor of Gävleborg County.

Holmberg was born in Lycksele, Västerbotten, and grew up in Jörn. She has a degree in social work from Stockholm University.

She was married to radio journalist Thomas Nordegren and has three children, including Elin Nordegren, who has been married to the American golfer Tiger Woods.

Career 
2008 – Governor of Gävleborg County
2003 – Minister, Ministry for Foreign Affairs
2003 – Director-General, Swedish Migration Board
2002 – State Secretary, Ministry for Foreign Affairs
1999 – Political Adviser, Ministry for Foreign Affairs
1999 – Project Leader, the Children's Project, Ministry for Foreign Affairs
1998 – Secretary of the Committee appointed to review the activities of the Office of the Children's Ombudsman
1996 – Secretary of the Committee on the Convention on the Rights of the Child (appointed to review Swedish legislation and practice in relation to the UN Convention)
1995 – Editor, Socialpolitik magazine
1989 – Freelance (assignments from the National Institute of Public Health, National Board of Health and Welfare, Ministry of Health and Social Affairs, Swedish Alcohol Retailing Monopoly, Swedish Association of Local Authorities, etc.)
1980 – Editor, PsykologTidningen magazine
1977 – Information Officer, National Association for Aid to Drug Abusers (RFHL)
1976 – Research Assistant, National Board of Health and Welfare

References

External links 
 Press release from the Swedish Government regarding Holmberg's appointment to landshövding (Swedish)

1952 births
Living people
County governors of Sweden
Stockholm University alumni
Swedish Ministers for Migration and Asylum Policy
Swedish Social Democratic Party politicians
Women government ministers of Sweden
21st-century Swedish women politicians
People from Lycksele Municipality
Women county governors of Sweden